Derrick Levasseur (born February 3, 1984) is an American television personality and private investigator from Providence, Rhode Island. He is best known for winning the reality television series Big Brother 16 in 2014. On March 31, 2016, Levasseur confirmed that he would be part of an upcoming Martin Sheen-produced series Hard Evidence: Is OJ Innocent on Investigation Discovery. Prior to Big Brother, Levasseur was a police officer in Central Falls, Rhode Island. He was one of the hosts on 2 seasons of Breaking Homicide on Investigation Discovery. Derrick also co-hosts two podcasts: one about true crime called Crime Weekly with YouTuber Stephanie Harlowe, as well one with fellow Big Brother winner Cody Calafiore called The Winner's Circle where they analyze the current season of Big Brother.

Big Brother 16
On Day 2, Levasseur formed an alliance and final two deal with fellow HouseGuest Cody Calafiore called "The Hitmen". Levasseur was also a member of the Team America alliance with fellow HouseGuests Frankie Grande and Donny Thompson, earning $75,000 by completing tasks as assigned by online voters. Levasseur won Head of Household (HOH) in weeks 3, 8, 10, and 12. He was the sole HOH for three out of those four weeks. He didn't sit on the block until the Final Three, making him the first HouseGuest to accomplish this since Danielle Reyes and Jason Guy, both of Big Brother 3. On finale night, when Calafiore won Head of Household and chose to take Levasseur to the final two, Levasseur won the game with a 7-2 jury vote, earning him $500,000. This, coupled with previously-earned Team America prize money, resulted in a grand total of $575,000 for Levasseur.

Professional career
Levasseur is a decorated police sergeant from Central Falls, Rhode Island. Hired at only twenty years old, he was one of the youngest officers in the department's history and worked in both the Patrol Division and the Detective Division. He was later assigned to the Special Investigations Unit as an undercover detective, where he had the opportunity to work with the ATF, DEA, FBI, and US Secret Service, resulting in numerous arrests and seizures. In addition to his experience in the field, he has advanced training in crime scene analysis, interview and interrogation techniques, and undercover operations.

In April 2007, while working patrol, Derrick responded to a 911 call for help. Upon arrival, he was informed by the caller that Selvin M. Garrido Morales was attempting to stab his friend and girlfriend with a knife. When Levasseur and other officers confronted Morales, Morales proceeded to charge at the officers with a knife. Levasseur shot and killed Morales(Derrick described it as a suicide by police)
. He and the other officers involved were cleared of any wrongdoing by a grand jury. Throughout the course of his career, Derrick has received multiple awards, including letters of recognition, unit citations, commendations, and the Medal of Valor, which is the highest honor a sworn officer can receive. In 2017, he was the recipient of the American Red Cross “Hero Award” after saving seven people from a burning building. Levasseur was a police officer for 13 years. He retired in 2017 to open his own private investigation firm, Break Investigative Group.

Personal life
Levasseur married Jana Blythe Donlin on April 30, 2011. Together, they have two daughters, Tenley Rose and Peyton.

References

1984 births
Living people
People from Providence, Rhode Island
Big Brother (American TV series) winners
American police officers
Television personalities from Rhode Island
American podcasters